Nikola Milojević was the defending champion but lost in the second round to Tomáš Macháč.

Alex Molčan won the title after defeating Macháč 6–0, 6–1 in the final.

Seeds

Draw

Finals

Top half

Bottom half

References

External links
Main draw
Qualifying draw

Svijany Open - 1
2021 Singles